Sentinel Falls is a long series of cascades descending into Yosemite Valley, in the U.S. state of California, alongside Sentinel Rock. It is a tiered waterfall consisting of 6 major drops totaling , the longest single drop being . It ranks on many lists as the twelfth-highest waterfall in the world, although in truth it is roughly the sixtieth-tallest, as most weaker waterfalls do not make it into such lists. Despite its immense height it has a relatively low drainage and is usually dry by July.

References

External links

Waterfalls of Yosemite National Park
Waterfalls of Mariposa County, California
Tiered waterfalls